The Movement for the Future of Curaçao (MFK) is a political party in Curaçao, founded by Gerrit Schotte in 2010, which has 9 of the 21 seats in the Estates of Curaçao after the 2021 elections.

The party entered the island council of Curaçao (which became the Estates of Curaçao on 10 October 2010) after the general election of 27 August 2010 as the second largest party, winning 5 of 21 seats. Its leader Gerrit Schotte became the first Prime Minister of Curaçao in a coalition cabinet of MFK, PS and MAN. In March 2017 Gilmar Pisas became the second MFK prime minister of Curaçao.

In April 2017 party leader Schotte stated he wished to obtain independence for Curaçao.

References

External links
 Official site

Political parties in Curaçao
Political parties established in 2010
2010 establishments in the Netherlands Antilles